Inhyeok Yeo is an a cappella singer who is best known for singing each part of a music score using only his own voice.

Career 
In 2013, he started making cover versions of music videos on YouTube, including a quick succession of the covers of Michael Jackson's "Thriller", "BAD", Stevie Wonder's "I Wish", Christopher Cross's "Sailing" and Eric Clapton's "Change the World". These cover songs became hits worldwide and gained over three million views.

His current goal is to win a Grammy Award.

Personal life 
 When he was 4th grade, he moved to Japan and lived in Kasugai, Aichi for 3 years. He returned to Korea for middle school.
 He graduated from Kyoto University with a degree in Economics. While he was a Kyoto University student, he joined the Kyoto a cappella circle, "CrazyClef".
 He is from the same a cappella circle as Kenichi Maeyamada.

Discography

Albums

As lead artist

As featured artist

Others 
 Power Rangers Dino Force Brave Opening theme "Zyuden Sentai Kyoryuger Brave" (as a chorus)

Filmography

Television

Commercials

References

External links 
  InhyeokYeo.wixsite.com/InhyeokYeo
 
 
 
 

South Korean male singers
English-language singers from South Korea
Musicians from Seoul
Living people
Kyoto University alumni
1987 births